The 1928 Santa Barbara State Roadrunners football team represented Santa Barbara State during the 1928 college football season.

Santa Barbara State competed in the California Coast Conference (CCC) from 1927–1928. The conference disbanded after the 1928 season, and the Roadrunners competed as an Independent the following two years. The 1928 Roadrunners were led by first-year head coach Harold Davis and played home games at Peabody Stadium in Santa Barbara, California. They finished the season with a record of four wins and five losses (4–5, 2–2 CCC). Overall, the team was outscored by its opponents 43–96 for the season and was shut out in all five of the losses.

Schedule

Notes

References

Santa Barbara State
UC Santa Barbara Gauchos football seasons
Santa Barbara State Roadrunners football